CKAU-FM is a French language First Nations community radio station that operates at 104.5 FM in Maliotenam, Quebec. A rebroadcaster at 90.1 FM, CKAU-FM-1, serves the adjacent communities of Sept-Îles and Uashat.

Owned by Corporation de Radio Kushapetsheken Apetuamiss Uashat, the station received CRTC approval in 1992.

References

External links
www.ckau.com
 

Kau
Kau
Kau
Innu culture
Radio stations established in 1992
1992 establishments in Quebec